Züngüləş (also, Zünqüləş, Zangyulyash, and Zungulyash) is a village and municipality in the Astara Rayon of Azerbaijan.  It has a population of 554.

References 

Populated places in Astara District